840 is the natural number following 839 and preceding 841.

Mathematical Properties
It is an even number.
It is a practical number.
It is a congruent number.
It is a highly composite number, with 32 divisors : 1, 2, 3, 4, 5, 6, 7, 8, 10, 12, 14, 15, 20, 21, 24, 28, 30, 35, 40, 42, 56, 60, 70, 84, 105, 120, 140, 168, 210, 280, 420, 840. Since the sum of its divisors (excluding the number itself) 2040 > 840
it is an abundant number and also a superabundant number, 
It is an idoneal number,
It is the least common multiple of 1, 2, 3, 4, 5, 6, 7, 8.
It is the largest number k such that all coprime quadratic residues modulo k are squares. In this case, they are 1, 121, 169, 289, 361 and 529.
It is an evil number.
It is a palindrome number and a repdigit number repeated in the positional numbering system in base 29 (SS) and in that in base 34 (OO).
It is the sum of a twin prime (419 + 421).

References

Integers